Émile Motte (1860 in Mons – 1931 in Brussels) was a Belgian painter. He was the director of l'Académie de Mons.

Works

L'Homme à la loupe
La paix divine
La Jeune fille à la robe d'argent (1894)
Aux temps des aïeux

External links
 

1860 births
1931 deaths
People from Mons
19th-century Belgian painters
19th-century Belgian male artists
20th-century Belgian painters
20th-century Belgian male artists